Ingress cancellation is an advanced physical layer technology that digitally removes in-channel ingress. If a carrier appears in the middle of the upstream data signal, ingress cancellation can remove the interfering carrier without causing packet loss. 

Ingress cancellation also removes one or more carriers that are higher in amplitude than the data signal. Ingress cancellation eventually will break if the in-channel ingress gets too high.

External links
Cisco used the term when describing a product

Digital electronics